Operation Redwing was a United States series of 17 nuclear test detonations from May to July 1956.  They were conducted at Bikini and Enewetak atolls by  Joint Task Force 7 (JTF7). The entire operation followed Project 56 and preceded Project 57. The primary intention was to test new, second-generation thermonuclear weapons. Also tested were fission devices intended to be used as primaries for thermonuclear weapons, and small tactical weapons for air defense. Redwing demonstrated the first United States airdrop of a deliverable hydrogen bomb during test Cherokee. Because the yields for many tests at Operation Castle in 1954 were dramatically higher than predictions, Redwing was conducted using an "energy budget": There were limits to the total amount of energy released, and the amount of fission yield was also strictly controlled. Fission, primarily "fast" fission of the natural uranium tamper surrounding the fusion capsule, greatly increases the yield of thermonuclear devices, and constitutes the great majority of the fallout, as nuclear fusion is a relatively clean reaction.

All shots were named after various Native American tribes.

Redwing series tests

References

External links
 
 
 Summary and review of The Atomic Times

Explosions in 1956
Redwing
Redwing
1956 in military history
1956 in the environment
1950s in the Marshall Islands
1956 in the Trust Territory of the Pacific Islands